This is the complete list of Pan American Games medalists in wrestling from 1951 to 2019.

Men's Freestyle

Freestyle (– 48 kg)

Freestyle (– 52 kg)

Freestyle (– 54 kg)

Freestyle (– 55 kg)

Freestyle (– 57 kg)

Freestyle (– 58 kg)

Freestyle (– 60 kg)

Freestyle (– 62 kg)

Freestyle (– 63 kg)

Freestyle (– 65 kg)

Freestyle (– 66 kg)

Freestyle (– 67 kg)

Freestyle (– 68 kg)

Freestyle (– 69 kg)

Freestyle (– 70 kg)

Freestyle (– 73 kg)

Freestyle (– 74 kg)

Freestyle (– 76 kg)

Freestyle (– 78 kg)

Freestyle (– 79 kg)

Freestyle (– 82 kg)

Freestyle (– 84 kg)

Freestyle (– 85 kg)

Freestyle (– 86 kg)

Freestyle (– 87 kg)

Freestyle (+ 87 kg)

Freestyle (– 90 kg)

Freestyle (– 96 kg)

Freestyle (– 97 kg)

Freestyle (+ 97 kg)

Freestyle (– 100 kg)

Freestyle (+ 100 kg)

Freestyle (– 120 kg)

Freestyle (– 125 kg)

Freestyle (– 130 kg)

Men's Greco-Roman

Greco-Roman (– 48 kg)

Greco-Roman (– 52 kg)

Greco-Roman (– 54 kg)

Greco-Roman (– 55 kg)

Greco-Roman (– 57 kg)

Greco-Roman (– 58 kg)

Greco-Roman (– 59 kg)

Greco-Roman (– 60 kg)

Greco-Roman (– 62 kg)

Greco-Roman (– 63 kg)

Greco-Roman (– 66 kg)

Greco-Roman (– 67 kg)

Greco-Roman (– 68 kg)

Greco-Roman (– 69 kg)

Greco-Roman (– 74 kg)

Greco-Roman (– 75 kg)

Greco-Roman (– 76 kg)

Greco-Roman (– 77 kg)

Greco-Roman (– 82 kg)

Greco-Roman (– 84 kg)

Greco-Roman (– 85 kg)

Greco-Roman (– 87 kg)

Greco-Roman (– 90 kg)

Greco-Roman (– 96 kg)

Greco-Roman (– 97 kg)

Greco-Roman (– 98 kg)

Greco-Roman (– 100 kg)

Greco-Roman (+ 100 kg)

Greco-Roman (– 120 kg)

Greco-Roman (– 130 kg)

Women's Freestyle

Freestyle (– 48 kg)

Freestyle (– 50 kg)

Freestyle (– 53 kg)

Freestyle (– 55 kg)

Freestyle (– 57 kg)

Freestyle (– 58 kg)

Freestyle (– 62 kg)

Freestyle (– 63 kg)

Freestyle (– 68 kg)

Freestyle (– 69 kg)

Freestyle (– 72 kg)

Freestyle (– 75 kg)

Freestyle (– 76 kg)

References

Wrestling